Monacobreen is a glacier in Haakon VII Land on Spitsbergen, Svalbard. The glacier debouches into Liefdefjorden. Former names of the glacier include Glacier de Monaco and Liefde Bay-bræ.

References 

Glaciers of Spitsbergen